The Niger Coast Protectorate was a British protectorate in the Oil Rivers area of present-day Nigeria, originally established as the Oil Rivers Protectorate in 1884 and confirmed at the Berlin Conference the following year. It was renamed on 12 May 1893, and merged with the chartered territories of the Royal Niger Company on 1 January 1900 to form the Southern Nigeria Protectorate.

References

 Thomas Pakenham, The Scramble for Africa (Random House, 1991), pp. 197–199
 StampWorldHistory
 Stamworld stamp

Former British protectorates
Former Nigerian administrative divisions
History of the petroleum industry
History of Nigeria
States and territories disestablished in 1900
Niger River Delta
Former British colonies and protectorates in Africa
Petroleum industry in Nigeria
Colonial Nigeria
1884 establishments in the British Empire
1900 disestablishments in Nigeria